The wedding of King Baudouin of Belgium, and Doña Fabiola de Mora y Aragón took place on Thursday, 15 December 1960. The couple was married first in a civil ceremony held in the Throne Room of the Royal Palace of Brussels and then in a Roman Catholic ceremony at the Cathedral of St. Michael and St. Gudula.

Engagement

The marriage of King Baudouin, who acceded to the throne in 1950, was of great interest to the Belgian people. Leo Joseph Suenens, Auxiliary Bishop of Mechelen, took matters into his own hands and sent Irish nun, Sister Veronica O’Brien, to find him a devout Catholic, Spanish, aristocratic wife. Sister O'Brien believed she found the perfect candidate in Fabiola de Mora y Aragón, who was then working as a hospital nurse.

The engagement was announced on 16 September 1960 by Gaston Eyskens, Prime Minister of Belgium. Afterwards, the couple met the press in the gardens of the Castle of Laeken. The news came as a pleasant surprise to the Belgian people, who were not aware the King and Doña Fabiola were courting.

Pre-wedding celebrations
Prior to departing Spain, Doña María del Carmen Polo y Martínez-Valdés, wife of Generalissímo Francisco Franco, presented Doña Fabiola with a strawberry leaf tiara, resembling a Ducal coronet, with interchangeable rubies, aquamarines and emeralds, on behalf of the Spanish government.

The wedding attracted media attention, both in Belgium and Spain and abroad. In its 6 September 1960, issue, TIME magazine called Doña Fabiola the "Cinderella Girl" and described her as "an attractive young woman, though no raving beauty" and "the girl who could not catch a man." Spanish bakers set out to honour the impending marriage by creating a type of bread called "la fabiola", which is still made in Palencia.

Two pre-wedding balls were held, the first on 13 December at the Cinquantenaire Museum and the second on 14 December at the Royal Palace of Brussels.

Wedding

Civil ceremony
Prior to the religious service, the couple were married civilly in the Throne Room of the Royal Palace of Brussels. The service was presided over by Albert Lilar, Minister of Justice, Lucien Cooremans, Mayor of Brussels, and a member of the Municipal Council. The witnesses were the groom's father, King Leopold III, his brother-in-law, Hereditary Grand Duke Jean of Luxembourg, the bride's brother, The Marqués of Casa Riera, and the pretender to the Spanish throne, the Count of Barcelona.

Religious ceremony
The religious service was conducted by Cardinal Jozef-Ernest van Roey at the Cathedral of St. Michael and St. Gudula. Cardinal Giuseppe Siri read a personal message from Pope John XXIII.

As the King and new Queen left the cathedral Handel's Hallelujah chorus from Messiah was played.

Attire
The bride's white silk and tulle gown, trimmed with ermine, had a high neckline, three-quarter length sleeves with a drop waist and a full skirt. It was designed by Cristóbal Balenciaga and had a 22-foot long train. She wore the Art Deco diamond tiara given to her late mother-in-law at the time of her own marriage in 1926.

The groom wore the uniform of a Lieutenant-General of the Armed Forces with the riband and star of the Belgian Order of Leopold and the collar of the Spanish Order of Isabella the Catholic.

Guests

As a descendant of Christian IX of Denmark, Louis Philippe I of France, Miguel I of Portugal and Francis, Duke of Saxe-Coburg-Saalfeld, Baudouin was closely related to most of the royals in Europe, many of whom were present at his marriage.

The groom's family
 King Leopold III of Belgium and The Princess of Réthy, the groom's father and stepmother
 The Hereditary Grand Duchess and Hereditary Grand Duke of Luxembourg, the groom's sister and brother-in-law
 The Prince and Princess of Liège, the groom's brother and sister-in-law
 Prince Alexandre of Belgium, the groom's half-brother
 Queen Elisabeth of Belgium, the groom's paternal grandmother
 Queen Marie-José and King Umberto II of Italy, the groom's paternal aunt and uncle
 Princess and Prince Alexander of Yugoslavia, the groom's first cousin and her husband, the groom's third cousin
 The Prince of Naples, the groom's first cousin
 Princess Maria Gabriella of Savoy, the groom's first cousin
 Princess Maria Beatrice of Savoy, the groom's first cousin

The bride's family
 The Dowager Marquesa of Casa Riera, the bride's mother
 The Countess and Count of Sástago, the bride's sister and brother-in-law
 The Marqués and Marquesa of Casa Riera, the bride's brother and sister-in-law
 The Duchess and Duke of Lécera, the bride's sister and brother-in-law
 Don Jaime de Mora y Aragón, the bride's brother
 The Marquesa and Marqués of Aguilar, the bride's sister and brother-in-law
 The Count de la Rosa de Abarca, the bride's brother

Foreign royal guests

Members of reigning royal houses
  The King of Norway, the groom's maternal uncle by marriage
  Princess Astrid of Norway, the groom's first cousin
  Princess and Prince Axel of Denmark, the groom's maternal aunt and uncle (representing the King of Denmark)
  Prince and Princess George Valdemar of Denmark, the groom's first cousin and his wife
  Count and Countess Flemming Valdemar of Rosenborg, the groom's first cousin and his wife
  The Duke of Halland, the groom's second cousin (representing the King of Sweden)
  The Queen and Prince Consort of the Netherlands, the groom's third cousin twice removed, and her husband
  Princess Beatrix of the Netherlands, the groom's fourth cousin once removed
  Princess Irene of the Netherlands, the groom's fourth cousin once removed
  The Grand Duchess and Prince Consort of Luxembourg, the groom's first cousins twice removed (also parents of the groom's brother-in-law)
  The Princess Margaret and Mr Antony Armstrong-Jones, the groom's third cousin and her husband (representing the Queen of the United Kingdom)
  Prince Gholamreza of Iran (representing the Shah of Iran)
  Prince Iskander Desta of Ethiopia (representing the Emperor of Ethiopia)

Members of non-reigning royal houses
 The Count and Countess of Barcelona, the groom's fourth cousin and his wife, the groom's third cousin once removed
 Prince Juan Carlos, the groom's fourth cousin
 Infanta María Cristina, Countess Marone, and Count Marone, the groom's fourth cousin and her husband
 King Michael I and Queen Anne of Romania, the groom's third cousin and his wife, the groom's second cousin once removed
 Tsar Simeon II of Bulgaria, the groom's fourth cousin
 Crown Prince Otto of Austria, the groom's second cousin once removed
 The Archduke and Archduchess of Austria-Este, the groom's second cousin once removed, and his wife
 The Duke and Duchess of Braganza, the groom's first cousin twice removed, and his wife, the groom's third cousin once removed
 The Princess Napoléon, wife of the groom's second cousin once removed

Other notable guests
 Don Cristóbal Martínez-Bordiú y Ortega and Doña María del Carmen Franco y Polo

Aftermath

King Baudouin and Queen Fabiola were married for 33 years. The couple had no children. Fabiola's five pregnancies ended in miscarriage in 1961, 1962, 1963, 1966 and 1968.

King Baudouin died on 31 July 1993 at the Villa Astrida, Motril in Spain. Queen Fabiola died on 5 December 2014 at Stuyvenberg Castle, Laeken.

References

Belgium
Belgium
1960s in Brussels